Eulepidotis modestula is a moth of the family Erebidae first described by Gottlieb August Wilhelm Herrich-Schäffer in 1869. It is found on Saint Kitts, Dominica, Grenada, the Bahamas, Jamaica, Cuba, Puerto Rico, St. Croix, as well as in Ecuador.

The larvae feed on Ceiba pentandra.

References

Moths described in 1869
modestula